is a Japanese motorcycle racer, currently racing for Sic58 Squadra Corse in the 2023 Moto3 World Championship.

Career
He was the Asia Talent Cup champion in 2014 and a Red Bull MotoGP Rookies Cup contestant in 2015 and 2016.

In  he remained in the same team. His best performance landed him in sixth place for Catalonia. He ended the season in 22nd place with 37 points. In , he remained in the same team and his teammate was Ai Ogura. He got his first World Championship victory in Qatar and ended the season in 19th place with 63 points.

Career statistics

Asia Talent Cup

Races by year
(key) (Races in bold indicate pole position; races in italics indicate fastest lap)

Red Bull MotoGP Rookies Cup

Races by year
(key) (Races in bold indicate pole position, races in italics indicate fastest lap)

FIM CEV Moto3 Junior World Championship

Races by year
(key) (Races in bold indicate pole position, races in italics indicate fastest lap)

Grand Prix motorcycle racing

By season

By class

Races by year
(key) (Races in bold indicate pole position, races in italics indicate fastest lap)

References

External links

2000 births
Living people
Japanese motorcycle racers
Moto3 World Championship riders
People from Fukuoka